Sir Charles Christopher Bowen  (29 August 1830 – 12 December 1917) was a New Zealand politician.

Life

Bowen was born in County Mayo, Ireland and studied law for two years at Cambridge University. At the age of 20 he emigrated with his parents on one of the First Four Ships, the Charlotte Jane, to the Canterbury settlement.

His law training led to a position as private secretary to John Robert Godley, founder of the Canterbury colony. He was in charge of the police force, and, together with Crosbie Ward, became a part-owner of the Lyttelton Times newspaper.

In 1859, Bowen traversed the Andes on with Clements Markham, and 16 July 1861, he married his sister Georgina Elizabeth Markham.

The same year he dedicated a volume of poetry, Poems, to "my fellow colonists, the first settlers of Canterbury, New Zealand.". The high quality of the edition is proof that "good craftsmen migrated along with the gentlemen-colonists".

Following their return to Christchurch, Bowen was appointed resident magistrate in 1864, succeeding Joseph Brittan, who had resigned on health grounds. Bowen held the position until 1874.

Political career

Bowen started his political career by getting elected to the first Canterbury Provincial Council for the Christchurch Country electorate on 10 September 1853. He served until the end of the first term and then successfully contested the Avon electorate, where he was returned on 6 November 1857. He served on the second to fourth Council representing the Avon electorate until 8 February 1865. He became the council's second Speaker in April 1855 and held that role until February 1865. He served on the Canterbury Executive Council from July to September 1857. He was the council's first Deputy-Superintendent from September 1857 to September 1862.

Bowen was directly appointed to cabinet (by way of the Legislative Council) on 16 December 1874, but wary of criticism that a public servant had been awarded political office, he resigned from the Legislative Council and stood for election to the House of Representatives in the 22 January 1875 Kaiapoi by-election, following the resignation of John Studholme on 8 December 1874.  He was confirmed by the Kaiapoi electorate at general elections in 1875 and 1879 and served until the end of the 7th Parliament in 1881, when he retired.  From 1874 to 1877, he was Minister of Justice in five successive ministries (first Vogel Ministry, Pollen Ministry, second Vogel Ministry, first and second Atkinson Ministry).  Bowen was responsible for the Education Act 1877, which provided for compulsory free, secular primary education.

He was again appointed to the Legislative Council on 20 January 1891 and served until his death on 12 December 1917. He was appointed as one of seven new members (including Harry Atkinson himself) appointed to the council by the outgoing fourth Atkinson Ministry; a move regarded by Liberals as a stacking of the upper house against the new government.

He was appointed Speaker of the Legislative Council from 1905 to 1915.

Bowen was made a Knight Bachelor in 1910 and a Knight Commander of the Order of St Michael and St George in 1914. He had seven children. He died on 12 December 1917 at his homestead and is buried at the cemetery of St Peter's Church in Upper Riccarton.

Notes

References

Further reading

 

|-

1830 births
1917 deaths
Members of the New Zealand House of Representatives
Members of the Cabinet of New Zealand
Speakers of the New Zealand Legislative Council
Members of the New Zealand Legislative Council
Irish emigrants to New Zealand (before 1923)
People from Christchurch
Politicians from County Mayo
New Zealand Knights Bachelor
New Zealand Knights Commander of the Order of St Michael and St George
Members of the Canterbury Provincial Council
Members of Canterbury provincial executive councils
New Zealand MPs for South Island electorates
Canterbury Pilgrims
Burials at St Peter's Church Cemetery, Upper Riccarton
19th-century New Zealand politicians
New Zealand politicians awarded knighthoods
Sheriffs of New Zealand
Justice ministers of New Zealand